Don't Ask Me was a popular British television science show made by Yorkshire Television for the ITV network and ran from 1974 to 1978. It attempted to answer science-based questions and contributors included Magnus Pyke (natural sciences), Rob Buckman (medicine), David Bellamy (biology), Miriam Stoppard (medicine), and Derek Griffiths. Those behind the scenes included Adam Hart-Davis, who later became a well-known science presenter in his own right.
The theme music was "House of the King" by the contemporary Dutch progressive rock band Focus.

The series was rebroadcast for a time on TVOntario.

A follow up called Don't Just Sit There ran for 19 episodes from 1979 to 1980. It was also produced by Yorkshire TV and featured the same panel.

References

External links
 
 

1970s British television series
1974 British television series debuts
1978 British television series endings
English-language television shows
Science education television series
Television series by Yorkshire Television